Ross County Football Club is a professional football club based in Dingwall, Scotland. They play all of their home matches at Victoria Park in Dingwall. The club currently play in the Scottish Premiership, being promoted after winning the Scottish Championship in the 2018–19 season. Prior to the 1994–95 season they played in the Highland Football League, a competition they won three times. They have also won the Scottish First Division, Scottish Championship, Second Division, Third Division (once each) and the Challenge Cup on three occasions. In 2010, they reached the Scottish Cup Final, and in 2016 they won the Scottish League Cup. Nicknamed The Staggies, County's colours are dark blue, red and white.

History

The club was formed in 1929 in what was then Ross and Cromarty after the previous local club from the North of Scotland Junior League Dingwall Victoria United (the 'Dingwall Vics') successfully applied for Highland Football League membership. The club was subsequently renamed Ross County. Playing in the Highland League from 1929, they won the championship on three occasions, first in 1967, then in 1991 and 1992. They also gained a reputation for their good performances in the early rounds of the Scottish Cup, upsetting league teams on eight occasions. The most notable of these upsets came on 8 January 1994, when they won 4–0 at Forfar Athletic, and were elected to the Scottish Football League three days later.

At the beginning of season 1994–95 the Scottish Football League was restructured into four tiers, and, following a vote on 11 January 1994, County were allocated one of the two vacancies in the new 10-club Division Three. County gathered 57 votes. They were joined by a new club created as a result of a merger of two teams to form Inverness Caledonian Thistle, who amassed 68 votes.

In 1998–99, Ross County were crowned Champions of the Third Division and thereby won promotion to the Second Division, where they finished in third place. This resulted in promotion to the First Division thanks to a reorganisation of the League, with the Premier League being expanded from ten clubs to twelve. After seven seasons in the First Division Ross County were relegated back to the Second Division in 2006–07. They won the Second Division in 2007–08, and were promoted back to the First Division. Ross County finished their first season back in the First Division in 8th place.

Their manager for a very short spell until October 2005, was former Inverness and Hearts manager John Robertson. He left the club on 24 October 2005, due to differences of opinion on a number of fundamental issues with the chairman. Gardner Spiers, a former Aberdeen coach, was appointed caretaker manager, but he too left in April 2006 after being told he would not be considered for appointment on a permanent basis. Director of Football George Adams took temporary charge before former Motherwell player Scott Leitch was appointed on 18 April 2006. Ross County won their first ever nationwide trophy when they won the Scottish Challenge Cup in November 2006 on penalties with Jason Crooks scoring the deciding spot kick on his competitive debut. Leitch, after winning the Challenge Cup but suffering relegation, stood down at the end of the 2006–07 season, almost exactly one year after his appointment. Former Partick Thistle manager Dick Campbell was announced as his replacement in May 2007. However, after a good run of results to start their Division 2 campaign, Campbell and the Ross County board decided to part company on 2 October 2007. Derek Adams (son of George Adams) took over as caretaker, and was confirmed as permanent manager a month later after the side's good form continued. County again reached the final of the Scottish Challenge Cup in 2008. They played Airdrie United at McDiarmid Park. Unlike two years previously, County lost in a penalty shootout where four penalties were missed. Ross County also reached the Challenge Cup final in April 2011 in which they beat Queen of the South 2–0.

In November 2010 Derek Adams left to become Colin Calderwood's assistant at Hibernian. Former Celtic player Willie McStay was appointed as his replacement in November 2010. McStay's tenure was short – lasting only 9 games. Jimmy Calderwood was then appointed until the end of the 2010–11 season. In May 2011, it was announced that Derek Adams was to return as manager.

On 23 March 2010, they defeated Scottish Premier League club Hibernian 2–1 in a Scottish Cup quarter-final replay at home at Victoria Park. In the semi-final, they played Celtic on Saturday 10 April 2010. In one of the biggest upsets in cup history, Ross County won 2–0 at Hampden Park and reached the final of the Scottish Cup for the first time in their history. More than 7,000 Ross County fans travelled to Glasgow to watch the game.

In the 2010 Scottish Cup Final on 15 May 2010, County lost 0–3 to Dundee United at Hampden Park. The match was watched by more than 17,000 Ross County fans.

Ross County secured promotion to the Scottish Premier League for the first time on 10 April 2012 when their nearest rival to the title Dundee failed to beat Queen of the South. During this push to promotion, Ross County embarked on a 40-game undefeated run in league football, which continued into the Scottish Premier League. The run was ended by St Johnstone on 22 September 2012. The Staggies parted company with George and Derek Adams on 28 August 2014 following a poor start to the 2014–15 campaign. Jim McIntyre was appointed manager on 9 September 2014, with Billy Dodds as his assistant.

On 13 March 2016, Ross County won their first ever major trophy when they beat Hibernian 2–1 in the final of the 2015–16 Scottish League Cup. The team's fortunes declined after this success, and they were relegated at the end of the 2017–18 season.

The club secured an immediate return to the Scottish Premiership after a 4–0 win at home to Queen of the South on 26 April 2019 saw them lift the 2018–19 Scottish Championship.

Kit history

Rivalry

Their main rivals are fellow Highlanders, Inverness Caledonian Thistle, with whom they contest the Highland derby. This, unlike many rivalries, is generally friendly as both sets of fans live and work together given their close geographic locations.  Due to the geographical proximity of the clubs and despite the rivalry, Inverness CT have signed many former Ross County players over the years, including Billy Mckay, Barry Wilson, Stuart Golabek, Roy McBain, Graham Bayne, Richard Hastings, Steven Hislop, John Rankin, Andrew Barrowman, Lionel Djebi-Zadi and Don Cowie. Many former Inverness CT players have also "crossed the bridge" in the opposite direction, most notably Grant Munro, Michael Fraser,  Ross Tokely and Coll Donaldson in recent years. Both Stuart Golabek and Andy Barrowman had two spells at County each, with the former also having two spells at ICT. A notable player is Iain Vigurs, who is one of (if not the first) few player(s) to cross the bridge more than twice, having spent two spells with both County and Caley Thistle.

Nickname
The club's nickname is the Staggies, taken from their badge which is a Caberfeidh, or Stag's Head. This in turn was taken from the regimental badge of the Seaforth Highlanders, the regiment in which many locals had fought and died during the Great War.

Mascot
Ross County's mascot, due to their affiliation with the stag crest of the Seaforth Highlanders, is a stag named Rosco, a play on the club's name.

Club records

 First league goal scored: William D Herd 1994 v Cowdenbeath
 Record all-time attendance: 8,000 approx v Rangers (Scottish Cup 28 February 1966)
 Record league attendance: 6,590 v Celtic (Scottish Premiership 18 November 2017)
 Record win: 11–0 v St Cuthbert Wanderers (1993–94 Scottish Cup first round)
 Record defeat: 0–7 v Kilmarnock (1961–62 Scottish Cup third round)
 Club record signing: £100,000 – Ross Draper from Inverness Caledonian Thistle, 9 August 2017
 Club record sale: Undisclosed – Liam Boyce to Burton Albion, 20 June 2017

Honours

League
 First Division/Championship (second tier)
 Winners (2): 2011–12, 2018–19
 Second Division (third tier)
 Winners (1): 2007–08
 Third Division (fourth tier)
 Winners (1): 1998–99
 Highland Football League
 Winners (3): 1966–67, 1990–91, 1991–92
 Runners-up (2): 1967–68, 1972–73
 North Caledonian Football League
 Winners (2): 1965–66, 1996–97

Cup
 Scottish League Cup:
 Winners (1): 2015–16
 Scottish Cup:
 Runners-Up (1): 2009–10
 Challenge Cup
 Winners (3): 2006–07, 2010–11, 2018–19
 Runners-up (2): 2004–05, 2008–09
 Qualifying Cup (North)
 Winners (1): 1993–94
 Runners-up (5): 1933–34, 1965–66, 1969–70, 1972–73, 1973–74
 North of Scotland Cup
 Winners (6): 1929–30, 1969–70, 1971–72, 1991–92, 2006–07, 2018–19
 Highland League Cup
Winners (4): 1949–50, 1968–69, 1978–79, 1991–92

Youth
 SPFL Development League (Under-20)
 Winners (1): 2016–17

Players

Current squad

On loan

Managers

Club staff

Coaching staff

References

External links

 Official site

 
Football in Highland (council area)
Former Highland Football League teams
Ross and Cromarty
Association football clubs established in 1929
1929 establishments in Scotland
Scottish Premier League teams
Scottish Football League teams
Scottish Challenge Cup winners
Scottish Professional Football League teams
Scottish League Cup winners